Saratov West is a air base in Russia located 12 km west of Saratov. It is an military training airfield.

The base is home to the 131st Training Helicopter Regiment as part of the Zhukovsky – Gagarin Air Force Academy.

References

External links
RussianAirFields.com

Soviet Air Force bases
Russian Air Force bases
Airports built in the Soviet Union
Airports in Saratov Oblast